Pyroscaphe was an early experimental steamship built by Marquis de Jouffroy d'Abbans in 1783. The first demonstration took place on 15 July 1783 on the river Saône in France. After the first demonstration, it was said that the hull had opened up and the boiler was letting out steam, faults common in early steamboats. In this case, it seems to have been easily repaired as the boat was said to have made several trips up and down the river. A month later, on 19 August, the boat carried several passengers who signed a witness protocol for a successful journey.

The Pyroscaphe was propelled by a double-acting steam machine and sidewheels, and was therefore a paddle steamer.

Specifications
(These figures are somewhat dubious, see .)
 Length: 13 m
 Beam: 4,5 m/14 ft 10 in
 Displacement: 163t
 Complement: 3

References

The Encyclopedia of Ships, ed. Tony Gibbons, Silverdale Books, 2002, 
Steamboat Evolution; A Short History, B.E.G. Clark, Fogdog Books,  (Amazon)

Steamships of France

Voyage de Balzac et Mme de Berny

A Guérande en pyroscaphe. 

En ce printemps 1830, Balzac fêtait le succès des « Chouans », premier d'une longue série de 85 romans, et avait rejoint sa maîtresse Laure de Berny en Touraine. Elle lui proposa alors « le plus poétique voyage qui soit possible en France ». Le 4 juin, ils embarquèrent sur un pyroscaphe à Saumur, descendirent la Loire par Angers et Saint-Nazaire (seize heures de voyage), et de là empruntèrent la patache du voiturier Bernus, une sorte de malle-poste brinquebalante pour arriver à Guérande, autant dire au bout du monde.